The Mach Loop (also known as the Machynlleth Loop) is a series of valleys in the United Kingdom in west-central Wales, notable for their use as low-level training areas for fast aircraft. The training area is part of the United Kingdom Low Flying System and lies within Low Flying Area 7 (LFA7), which covers most of Wales.

Activity 
Aircraft seen in the area include Royal Air Force Airbus A400M, Typhoon, Hawk jets and C-130J Super Hercules and Short Tucano as well as  F-15C Eagles and F-15E Strike Eagles which are based at RAF Lakenheath and MC-130 and V-22 Osprey from RAF Mildenhall. Aircraft from other European nations have been sighted training in the Mach Loop, such as F-16 Fighting Falcons of the Belgian Air Component.

In December 2018 a recommendation was circulated within the Ministry of Defence (MoD) which resulted in a reduction in the number of aircraft using the Mach Loop. Since this time RAF frontline squadrons operating Typhoon and F-35Bs have not flown the Loop. In addition to this all non-UK based aircraft are also prohibited from using the Loop unless part of a UK exercise.

Photography
The Mach Loop is among the few places in the world where photographers can see combat aircraft flying below them. One popular viewing point is the carpark located on the site of Llyn y Tri Greyenyn.

In virtual aviation
It is possible to fly the Mach Loop using a flight simulator. Arguably the most accurate representation is with Microsoft's Flight Simulator platform, launched in 2020.  The simulator streams Bing Maps data to reproduce the contours and appearance of the loop and surrounding countryside with an increasing range of jet aircraft available to make the flight. 

An alternative is the FlightGear flight simulator, created by the FGUK community as an add-on for the simulator, which provides the player with the challenge of guiding aircraft at high speed through rings that mark the route. In addition, the scenario has "start" and "finish" points, and each run in the Mach Loop is timed to let the player know the time per lap.

The International Virtual Aviation Organisation (IVAO)  had an event using the Mach Loop.

See also
Rainbow Canyon (California)

References

External links

 RAF Low Flying Training Timetables
 MachLoop.co.uk

Geography of Wales
Low flying
Royal Air Force
United States Air Force